The 2010-11 season saw Glasgow Warriors compete in the competitions: the Magners Celtic League and the European Champions Cup, the Heineken Cup.

Season Overview

Team

Coaches

Squad

Academy players

  George Hunter - Prop

  Murray McConnell - Scrum-half
  James Johnstone - Centre
  Mike Doneghan - Wing
  Kerr Gossman - Wing

Back-up players

  Kris Hamilton (Glasgow Hawks) - Scrum-half

Player statistics

During the 2010–11 season, Glasgow have used 43 different players in competitive games. The table below shows the number of appearances and points scored by each player.

Staff movements

Coaches

Personnel In

Personnel Out

Player movements

Academy promotions

Player transfers

In

 Steve Swindall from  Rotherham Titans

Out

 Steve Swindall to  Amatori Rugby Milano

Competitions

Pre-season and friendlies

Match 1

Dundee HSFP: 
Replacements: 

Glasgow Warriors: Colin Shaw, Richie Gray, Kevin Tkachuk, Aly Muldowney, Ryan Wilson, Duncan Weir, Chris Fusaro, Ed Kalman, Steve Swindall, Michael Doneghan, Rob Dewey, Federico Martín Aramburú, Hefin O'Hare, Chauncey O'Toole, Finlay Gillies, Gordon Reid, Murray McConnell, Alex Dunbar, Peter Horne, Ryan Grant, Peter Murchie, Kris Hamilton (Glasgow Hawks)

Match 2

Glasgow Warriors: Bernardo Stortoni (c); D. T. H. van der Merwe, Max Evans, Rob Dewey, Federico Martín Aramburú; Ruaridh Jackson, Henry Pyrgos; Ryan Grant, Fergus Thomson, Moray Low, Aly Muldowney, Richie Gray, Ryan Wilson, Chris Fusaro, Richie Vernon
Replacements (all used):  Paul Burke, Alex Dunbar, Calum Forrester, Finlay Gillies, Rob Harley, Peter Horne, Ed Kalman, Pat MacArthur, Murray McConnell, Peter Murchie, Colin Shaw, Stevie Swindall, Kevin Tkachuk, Duncan Weir

Sale Sharks: Paul Williams; Tom Brady, Fergus Mulchrone, Nick Macleod, Ben Cohen; Matty James, Dwayne Peel; Aston Croall, Neil Briggs, Karena Wihongi, Nic Rouse, James Gaskell (c), Carl Fearns, James Harris, Sisaro Koyamaibole
Replacements: Kyle Tonetti, Anitelea Tuilagi, Rhys Crane, Rob Miller, Chris Leck, Jack Forster, Simon McIntyre, Marc Jones, Sean Cox, Wame Lewaravu, David Seymour, Kristian Ormsby

Match 3

Wasps: Mark Van Gisbergen, Richard Haughton, Ben Jacobs, Dom Waldouck, Tom Varndell, Riki Flutey, Joe Simpson, Tim Payne, Rob Webber, Phil Vickery, Simon Shaw, Richard Birkett, Joe Worsley, Tom Rees (c), John Hart
Replacements: Tom Lindsay, Zak Taulafo, Ben Broster, Dan Ward-Smith, Serge Betsen, Nic Berry, Dave Walder, Jack Wallace, James Cannon, Sam Jones, Christian Wade

Glasgow Warriors: Bernardo Stortoni (c), D. T. H. van der Merwe, Max Evans, Graeme Morrison, Hefin O"Hare, Duncan Weir, Henry Pyrgos, Jon Welsh, Fergus Thomson, Moray Low, Tom Ryder, Richie Gray, Stevie Swindall, Calum Forrester, Richie Vernon
Replacements: Pat MacArthur, Kevin Tkachuk, Aly Muldowney, Ryan Grant, Ruaridh Jackson, Colin Shaw, Peter Murchie, Peter Horne, Will Cliff, Robert Harley, Alex Dunbar, Ryan Wilson

European Champions Cup

Pool 6

Results

Round 1

Round 2

Round 3

Round 4

 This match was postponed twice from its originally scheduled kickoff of 18 December. Weather-related travel delays prevented Glasgow from arriving in Toulouse until hours before the planned kickoff, causing a postponement to 19 December. The team's equipment, which was travelling on a separate flight, was further delayed, leading to the second postponement.

Round 5

Round 6

Magners Celtic League

League table

Results

Round 1

Round 2

Round 3

Round 4

Round 5

Round 6

Round 7

Round 8

Round 9

Round 10

Round 11: 1872 Cup (1st Leg)

Round 12: 1872 Cup (2nd Leg)

Glasgow Warriors won the 1872 Cup with an aggregate score of 47 - 46.

Round 13

Round 14

Round 15

Round 16

Round 17

Round 18

Round 19

Round 20

Round 21

Round 22

End of Season awards

Competitive debuts this season

A player's nationality shown is taken from the nationality at the highest honour for the national side obtained; or if never capped internationally their place of birth. Senior caps take precedence over junior caps or place of birth; junior caps take precedence over place of birth. A player's nationality at debut may be different from the nationality shown. Combination sides like the British and Irish Lions or Pacific Islanders are not national sides, or nationalities.

Players in BOLD font have been capped by their senior international XV side as nationality shown.

Players in Italic font have capped either by their international 7s side; or by the international XV 'A' side as nationality shown.

Players in normal font have not been capped at senior level.

A position in parentheses indicates that the player debuted as a substitute. A player may have made a prior debut for Glasgow Warriors in a non-competitive match, 'A' match or 7s match; these matches are not listed.

Tournaments where competitive debut made:

Crosshatching indicates a jointly hosted match.

Sponsorship

Official Kit Supplier

Canterbury - Official Kit Supplier

References

2010–11
2010–11 in Scottish rugby union
2010–11 Celtic League by team
2010–11 Heineken Cup by team